This article lists political parties and socio-political movements in the partially recognised Republic of Abkhazia. Abkhazia has a multi-party system. Political parties tend to not have stable ideological platforms, and as such, party actions and support tend to depend on the attitudes/beliefs of the party leader.

The current coalition is formed by United Abkhazia, Amtsakhara and Aitaira.

Political parties 
There are ten political parties in Abkhazia, two of which are represented in the People's Assembly.

Movements 
Furthermore, there is a number of socio-political movements:
Aidgylara
Aiaaira
Akhatsa
Movement of the Mothers of Abkhazia for Peace and Social Justice
Russian Citizens Union
Union of the Defenders of Abkhazia

External links of other parties
Coalition for a Democratic Abkhazia

See also
 List of political parties in Georgia
 List of political parties in South Ossetia
 Lists of political parties

Abkhazia
 
Political parties